Fanweyn is a town in the southwestern Gedo region of Somalia, located in the Baardheere District.

References
Health Facilities in Gedo Region (Somalia)

Populated places in Gedo